The prime minister of Tajikistan is the title held by the head of government of Tajikistan. After the president, the prime minister is second most powerful person of the country. The prime minister coordinates the work of the Cabinet and advises and assists the president in the execution of the functions of government.

List of prime ministers of Tajikistan (1925–present)

Tajik Autonomous Soviet Socialist Republic (1925–1929)

Chairmen of the Council of People's Commissars
Nusratulla Maksum Lutfullayev (1925–1926)
Polat Usmon Khodzhayev (December 1926 – 1928)
Mumin Khodzhayev (March 1928 – December 1929)

Tajik Soviet Socialist Republic (1929–1991)

Chairmen of the Council of People's Commissars
Abdurrahim Hojibayev (December 1929 – 28 December 1933)
Abdullo Rakhimbayev (28 December 1933 – February 1937)
Urunboi Ashurov (February – September 1937)
Mamdali Kurbanov (September 1937 – April 1946)

Chairmen of the Council of Ministers
Jabbor Rasulov (April 1946 – 29 March 1955)
Tursun Uljabayev (29 March 1955 – 25 May 1956)
Nazarsho Dodkhudoyev (25 May 1956 – 12 April 1961)
Abdulakhad Kakharov (12 April 1961 – 24 July 1973)
Rahmon Nabiyev (24 July 1973 – 20 April 1982)
Qahhor Mahkamov (26 April 1982 – 26 January 1986)
Izatullo Khayoyev (26 January 1986 – 6 December 1990)

Republic of Tajikistan (1991–present)

Prime ministers

See also
List of leaders of Tajikistan
President of Tajikistan
Vice President of Tajikistan

References 

Tajikistan
Government of Tajikistan
 
Prime Ministers
1991 establishments in Tajikistan